The Blackwell Legacy is a graphic adventure video game developed by Wadjet Eye Games for the Microsoft Windows, Linux, macOS, iOS and Android. It is the first part of the Blackwell series and follows Rosangela Blackwell, a young freelance writer living a solitary life in New York City. She experiences headaches throughout the day and it culminates in a ghost named Joey Mallone making an appearance in her apartment. It is revealed that Rosa is a medium like her aunt and that her job is to help ghosts that are stuck in the real world move on.

Gameplay
The Blackwell Legacy is a point-and-click adventure, where the player can interact with objects and characters of interest by clicking on them. A left click interacts with objects and people, and directs Rosa where to go, while right clicking allows examination of items. There is an inventory that houses all of the player's items, and whatever oddities the player collects during their adventure. Rosa carries along a notepad, where she writes down any important names or keywords. While trying to figure out connections between certain people or objects, two terms can be combined. That often gives the players a clue as to what to do next. The game is designed in the way that fully voice acted dialogue and characterization play a big part in the narrative.

Plot

Rosangela 'Rosa' Blackwell, an introverted book review columnist for the Village Eye newspaper, returns home after scattering the ashes of her late aunt, Lauren Blackwell, at Queensboro Bridge. She briefly laments over how she barely knew her and now has no family. Her grandparents have long since passed; her parents died in a car accident when she was young; and her aunt had been institutionalized in an induced coma for decades after a mental breakdown. Moments later, she is contacted by Dr. Quentin from Bellevue Hospital, who warns her of her aunt's, as well as Rosa's grandmother's, mental disorder, and that it is likely hereditary. Unfazed despite her recent headaches, Rosa reads the Blackwell family letters previously in hospital possession, depicting both women's gradual breakdowns and isolationist behaviors at the same time they began interacting with a non-existing person both call "Joey". Afterwards, Rosa is assigned by the Village Eye to write about the recent suicide of a New York University student, JoAnn Sherman.

Despite barely getting information on the suicide case, Rosa manages to write the article and sends it out. After doing so, her ever-increasing migraine intensifies until a ghostly figure of a man in a fedora and business suit appears before her. The ghost introduces himself as Joey Mallone, the Blackwell family's spirit guide, and explains that Rosa is a medium who can see and communicate with other ghosts. Rosa's recent migraines since her aunt's death were symptoms of her latent medium abilities awakening. As such, she must help them pass on to the afterlife by making them become self-aware and come to terms with their deaths. When Rosa tries asking Joey to go away, he explains he is irremediably attached to her, as he was previously to the other women of her family, and thus cannot go very far from her. Joey also explains that Rosa's grandmother had outright rejected her role as a medium, and her aunt quit being a medium after several years of being one. This rejection of the role apparently caused their eventual mental breakdowns.

Joey asks Rosa to take him to Washington Square Park, where they discover the ghost of JoAnn's friend by the dog park, Alli Montego. Unable to convince the ghost of her death, Rosa starts a proper investigation on JoAnn and her two friends, one whom also committed suicide and another whom is currently admitted in Bellevue after an attempted suicide. Rosa discovers JoAnn and her friends had played with an ouija board, accidentally summoning a restless ghost called the "Deacon", which led JoAnn and Alli to take their own lives when the ghost wouldn't stop haunting them. Rosa borrows her neighbor's dog and takes it to the dog park to convince Alli's ghost, who once aspired to be a veterinarian, to pass on. As a final request, Alli asks Rosa to keep an eye on Susan Lee, the friend who is still alive in Bellevue.

Breaking into the Bellevue Hospital late at night to watch over her, Rosa and Joey intercept the "Deacon", revealed to be the ghost of a priest whom fell from grace and into alcoholism after his wife passed away. After being summoned, he constantly harassed JoAnn, Allie, and Susan to save him from his condemnation in Hell. Joey and Rosa eventually convince the Deacon to give in and allow himself to resign to his fate, until Rosa and the Deacon come face to face with a demon, blocking the way to the afterlife unless the Deacon accepts the punishment for his sins. Through hints the demon ends up giving, Rosa realizes the Deacon's alcohol flask is the source of all his sins and destroys it, redeeming the remorseful Deacon's soul and finally granting him passage to eternal rest.

With the case finally closed, Rosa and Joey return home. Fascinated by her recent experiences, Rosa asks Joey why Lauren stopped being a medium. Joey explains that Lauren decided to retire as a medium only after adopting Rosa when Rosa's parents died in a car crash. Intending to honor both the aunt and grandmother she barely knew, Rosa embraces her newfound identity as a medium.

Development
The game was developed using the Adventure Game Studio engine. Due to technical issues, it remained a Windows-only title at the beginning, even though the runtime itself had been ported to Linux and Mac OS X It was later released for those platforms in 2014, as well as Android, in Humble Bundle PC & Android 11. Ian Schlaepfer was a designer of the characters art, while Chris Femo and Tom Scary created the backgrounds, which include some of the New York cityscapes, like the Bellevue Hospital, the Queensboro Bridge, and more.

The project originally began as Bestowers of Eternity, and was released as freeware in 2003. Subsequently, it was decided for the project to be extended and redone into a proper commercial product, which ultimately became The Blackwell Legacy.

Reception

Upon its release, The Blackwell Legacy was met with "generally favourable" reviews from critics for the Microsoft Windows, with an aggregate score of 80% on Metacritic.

It was nominated for 4 AGS Awards in 2006 and won the award for Best Character Art.

References

External links

Bestowers of Eternity at Adventure Game Studio
Download of Bestowers of Eternity at Archive.org

2006 video games
Adventure Game Studio games
Adventure games
AGS Award winners
Android (operating system) games
Indie video games
IOS games
Linux games
MacOS games
Point-and-click adventure games
Single-player video games
Video game remakes
Video games about ghosts
Video games developed in the United States
Video games featuring female protagonists
Video games set in 2006
Video games set in New York City
Wadjet Eye Games games
Windows games